James Stuart Douglas (19 June 1868 – 2 January 1949), popularly known as Rawhide Jimmy, was a Canadian born, American businessman and mining executive.

Early life
Douglas was the son of Canadian mining engineer and executive  James Walter Douglas  (1837–1918) and Naomi Eleanor Douglas
(1838–1922). Born at Inverness, Quebec, Jimmy Douglas grew up in Phoenixville, Pennsylvania, where his father managed the Chemical Copper Company. Douglas left home at 17 and moved west to Manitoba, where he homesteaded. Suffering from asthma, he moved to the Arizona Territory, in the United States, in the hope that the drier climate might provide relief.

Career
He  moved to Bisbee, Arizona at his father's request to work as an assayer for the Copper Queen Mine.
His father had acquired an interest in the mine from the Phelps Dodge mining company.

In 1892 Douglas moved to Prescott to work for the Commercial Mining Company, an affiliate of the Phelps Dodge. Eight years later he was transferred to Sonora, Mexico, to manage the copper mine and smelter at Pilares and Nacozari; and directed construction of a railroad from Douglas, Arizona to Nacozari. While at Pilares, he acquired his nickname, "Rawhide Jimmy", because of his technique of using rawhide to protect the rollers on mining equipment. Afterward, he moved to Cananea, Sonora, to manage the copper operations there.

UVX Mining Co.

In 1912, Douglas returned to central Arizona, where he took an option on the United Verde Extension (UVX) property, a speculative venture to find the down-faulted extension of the great "United Verde" ore body near Jerome, Arizona. In 1914, with funds near exhaustion, an exploration drift cut bonanza copper ore. The UVX mine started to produce a profit. The mine produced copper, silver, and gold valued at $10 million in 1916 alone, with a profit of $7.4 million. The UVX paid $55 million in dividends during its life (1915–1938), making Douglas a wealthy man.

Personal life
James Douglas was married to Josephine Leah Williams (1872–1941).
Their son, Lewis W. Douglas  (1894–1974), also entered the mining business, went on to a successful political career as an Arizona Congressman from 1927 to 1933. He served as the Ambassador to the United Kingdom (1947–51). 
In 1939, Douglas retired to Quebec where he died of heart failure in 1949.

Jerome State Historic Park
The Douglas Mansion is open to the public as the Jerome State Historic Park.

References

Further reading

External links
 Official Jerome State Historic Park website

Canadian mining businesspeople
American miners
Arizona pioneers
People from Lac-Mégantic, Quebec
1868 births
1949 deaths
People from Centre-du-Québec
People from Prescott, Arizona
People from Jerome, Arizona
American mining businesspeople